Peterson is an unincorporated community in northwestern Morgan County, Utah, United States.

Geography

History
Peterson was first settled in 1855. It was originally named Weber City after the nearby Weber River. The first public building, a combination school and LDS Church, was opened in 1861. The town was designated county seat in 1862, and remained so for four years, until it was replaced by Littleton in 1866, and then Morgan in 1868. The Peterson General Store, which also housed a U.S. post office, opened in 1869. Other businesses included the Dexter Hotel, a train station, and a stockyard.

In 1872, the town's name was changed to Peterson to honor an early settler, Charles Sreeve Peterson. Peterson was a Mormon leader, and the first settler of Morgan County.

See also

References

External links

Unincorporated communities in Morgan County, Utah
Populated places established in 1855
Unincorporated communities in Utah
1855 establishments in Utah Territory